The competition this year saw 3 teams taking part with the Czech Republic being joined by Malta and Greece. The winners were Greece.

Results

See also

References

External links

European rugby league competitions
2014 in rugby league